Barry Railway Class G were  steam tank locomotives of the Barry Railway in South Wales.  They were designed by J. F. Hosgood, built by both Vulcan Foundry and Sharp Stewart and were introduced in 1892. Initially used for the Barry to Cardiff suburban service, they were transferred to passenger duties on the main line between Barry and Porth as well as the service between Pontypridd Graig and Cardiff Clarence Road, once the 'J' class had displaced them on the Barry to Cardiff run.  The company insisted that their passenger locomotives should be smartly turned out and the 'G' class was no exception.  The locomotives passed to the Great Western Railway in 1922.  None survived into British Railways ownership and none have been preserved.

Numbering

References

G
0-4-4T locomotives
Vulcan Foundry locomotives
Sharp Stewart locomotives
Railway locomotives introduced in 1892
Standard gauge steam locomotives of Great Britain
Scrapped locomotives
Passenger locomotives